Range concatenation grammar (RCG) is a grammar formalism developed by Pierre Boullier  in 1998 as an attempt to characterize a number of phenomena of natural language, such as Chinese numbers and German word order scrambling, which are outside the bounds of the mildly context-sensitive languages.

From a theoretical point of view, any language that can be parsed in polynomial time belongs to the subset of RCG called positive range concatenation grammars, and reciprocally.

Though intended as a variant on Groenink's literal movement grammars (LMGs), RCGs treat the grammatical process more as a proof than as a production. Whereas LMGs produce a terminal string from a start predicate, RCGs aim to reduce a start predicate (which predicates of a terminal string) to the empty string, which constitutes a proof of the terminal strings membership in the language.

Description

Formal definition 
A Positive Range Concatenation Grammar (PRCG) is a tuple , where:
Each predicate name has an associated arity given by the function .
  is the start predicate name and verify .

A Negative Range Concatenation Grammar (NRCG) is defined like a PRCG, but with the addition that some predicates occurring in the right-hand side of a clause can have the form . Such predicates are called negative predicates.

A Range Concatenation Grammar is a positive or a negative one. Although PRCGs are technically NRCGs, the terms are used to highlight the absence (PRCG) or presence (NRCG) of negative predicates.

Two ranges  and  can be concatenated iff , and we then have: .

Recognition of strings 
Like LMGs, RCG clauses have the general schema , where in an RCG,  is either the empty string or a string of predicates. The arguments  consist of strings of terminal symbols and/or variable symbols, which pattern match against actual argument values like in LMG. Adjacent variables constitute a family of matches against partitions, so that the argument , with two variables, matches the literal string  in three different ways: .

Predicate terms come in two forms, positive (which produce the empty string on success), and negative (which produce the empty string on failure/if the positive term does not produce the empty string).

The rewrite semantics for RCGs is rather simple, identical to the corresponding semantics of LMGs.

A proof/recognition of a string  is done by showing that  produces the empty string. For the individual rewrite steps, when multiple alternative variable matches are possible, any rewrite which could lead the whole proof to succeed is considered. Thus, if there is at least one way to produce the empty string from the initial string , the proof is considered a success, regardless of how many other ways to fail exist.

Example

RCGs are capable of recognizing the non-linear index language  as follows:

Letting x, y, and z be variable symbols:

Or, using the more correct dotted notation for ranges:

References

Formal languages
Grammar frameworks